Tanc so Zvezdite is the Macedonian version of the BBC Worldwide format Dancing with the Stars. The first season of the show started on 8 March 2013 and has been aired on MRT 1.

Season 1 (2013)

Scores

Season 2 (2014)

Scores

Week 1
Running order

Week 2
Running order

References

External links
 Official Site

Dancing with the Stars
2013 Macedonian television series debuts
Dance competition television shows
Macedonian television series
Non-British television series based on British television series
2010s Macedonian television series
Macedonian Radio Television original programming